The 1947–48 Western Kentucky State Teachers Hilltoppers men's basketball team represented Western Kentucky State Teachers College (now known as Western Kentucky University) during the 1947-48 NCAA basketball season. The team was led by future Naismith Memorial Basketball Hall of Fame coach Edgar Diddle.  The Hilltoppers won the Kentucky Intercollegiate Athletic Conference championship, were NCAA Annual Team Champions, and received an invitation to the 1948 National Invitation Tournament, where they advanced to the semifinals.  During this period, the NIT was considered by many to be the premiere college basketball tournament, with the winner being recognized as the national champion.
This was one of the finest teams in Western Kentucky history, they had the best winning percentage in the NCAA, all five starters were named to the All-KIAC Team (Odie Spears, John Oldham, Don “Duck” Ray, Dee Gibson, and Oran McKinney) and three players were listed on various All-American teams, Spears, Ray, and Gibson.

Schedule

|-
!colspan=6| Regular Season

|-

|-
!colspan=6| 1948 Kentucky Intercollegiate Athletic Conference Tournament

|-
!colspan=6| 1948 National Invitation Tournament

References

Western Kentucky Hilltoppers basketball seasons
Western Kentucky State Teachers
Western Kentucky State
Western Kentucky State Teachers
Western Kentucky State Teachers